Chestnut Ridge is the westernmost ridge of the Allegheny Mountains in Pennsylvania. It is located primarily within the Laurel Highlands region of southwestern Pennsylvania, extending into northern West Virginia.

Geography
Chestnut Ridge rises in southern Indiana County and continues to the south-southwest for approximately 75 miles.

The ridge passes near the cities of: Blairsville,  Derry, Latrobe, Mt. Pleasant, Connellsville, and Uniontown in Pennsylvania; and Morgantown in West Virginia.

The Chestnut Ridge people take their name from this region.

External links

Appalachian Mountains
Laurel Highlands
Ridges of West Virginia
Ridges of Pennsylvania
Landforms of Fayette County, Pennsylvania
Landforms of Indiana County, Pennsylvania
Landforms of Monongalia County, West Virginia
Landforms of Preston County, West Virginia
Landforms of Westmoreland County, Pennsylvania